River Road is a residential suburb of Hamilton, sited on the eastern bank of the Waikato River. The namesake road runs from Claudelands Bridge north to Pukete Bridge and beyond, to Ngāruawāhia, but the main part of the suburb is between Boundary Road and Donny Park. Properties close to the river are much more expensive than those further away. Most of River Road was shown on an 1865 map, though it was some years later before it was built and, by 1866, only one bridge had been built.

A walking path runs along the river bank, but it does not cover the entire length of the area.

Demographics

Miropiko had a population of 3,186 at the 2018 New Zealand census, an increase of 9 people (0.3%) since the 2013 census, and an increase of 195 people (6.5%) since the 2006 census. There were 1,185 households, comprising 1,530 males and 1,656 females, giving a sex ratio of 0.92 males per female. The median age was 39.3 years (compared with 37.4 years nationally), with 597 people (18.7%) aged under 15 years, 645 (20.2%) aged 15 to 29, 1,464 (46.0%) aged 30 to 64, and 480 (15.1%) aged 65 or older.

Ethnicities were 82.1% European/Pākehā, 14.3% Māori, 4.3% Pacific peoples, 8.0% Asian, and 3.2% other ethnicities. People may identify with more than one ethnicity.

The percentage of people born overseas was 20.2, compared with 27.1% nationally.

Although some people chose not to answer the census's question about religious affiliation, 46.5% had no religion, 43.0% were Christian, 0.8% had Māori religious beliefs, 1.1% were Hindu, 0.5% were Muslim, 0.8% were Buddhist and 1.9% had other religions.

Of those at least 15 years old, 933 (36.0%) people had a bachelor's or higher degree, and 279 (10.8%) people had no formal qualifications. The median income was $41,400, compared with $31,800 nationally. 639 people (24.7%) earned over $70,000 compared to 17.2% nationally. The employment status of those at least 15 was that 1,359 (52.5%) people were employed full-time, 390 (15.1%) were part-time, and 69 (2.7%) were unemployed.

Although the statistical area is called Miropiko, Miropiko Pā, one of the six pās in Hamilton, lay just to the south in Claudelands.

Education
Waikato Diocesan School is a private girls secondary school  (years 9-13) with boarding facilities.

Notable buildings
Bankwood House, 660 River Road, is a residence designed by Thomas Henry White and built in 1892 on what was then rural land.

References

Suburbs of Hamilton, New Zealand